The House with Atlantes, also known as Macri House, is a historical monument in Timișoara, Romania. It is located on an important commercial street in the historic center of the city. Its name comes from the atlantes depicted on the columns that make up the facade of the building.

History 

The house was built between 1812 and 1816 in neoclassical style by Toma Naum Macri (1791–1849), a rich merchant from Timișoara of Aromanian origin. It had about 40 rooms, quite spacious, according to the fashion of the time, and was intended for occasional tenants. The house was among the first civilian buildings in the Liberty Square, reserved at that time for military administration buildings. By 1788, there was a Turkish house with wooden floor and payanda on the current site of the Macri House.

After Macri's death, the building became the property of his daughter Sida (Persida), who then also married an Aromanian, Stoica (also known by his Serbianized name Stojković). Under the gate there is a reddish marble plaque commemorating, in the Serbian language, Persida Macri-Stoicovici. It was fixed on the wall in 1886. Later the house was donated to the Aromanian-Serbian community, then it was owned by the Serbian Orthodox Diocese of Timișoara, from 1968 by the Romanian state and after 1989 it became private property and was renovated.

Architecture 
The house is recognizable for the 12 8-meter high atlantes that adorn its facade. They were made by Hungarian architect Lipót Baumhorn later, at the beginning of the 20th century. The main entrance located on the short side from the Liberty Square is a stone portal, flanked by two Ionic columns that also support the building's only balcony and that keep two wheel launchers in the form of cannons buried with the barrel upside down. According to local legends, they would be the first Turkish cannons conquered by the Habsburg army during the 1716 siege.

References 

Houses completed in 1816
Buildings and structures in Timișoara
Neoclassical architecture in Romania
Historic monuments in Timiș County
Atlas (mythology)